Evelina Nikolajeva (born 1998) is a Latvian ice hockey player. She is a member of the Laima Rīga team and the Latvia women's national ice hockey team.

References

Latvian women's ice hockey players
Latvian ice hockey players
1998 births
Living people